Narva Waterfall is the waterfall on Narva River, Estonia and Russia.

Between the southeast part of the city of Narva and the rest, facing the Russian city of Ivangorod, the Narva flows over the Baltic Klint, forming Narva Waterfall, once among the most powerful in Europe. Before the water reaches the falls it is split into two branches by the Kreenholm island, thus the falls consist of two sections. Kreenholm Falls, west of the island, is 60 m wide and 6.5 m high with multiple terraces. Joala Falls, to the east, is 110 m wide and up to 6.5 m high. The Estonian–Russian border follows the eastern branch and goes through Joala Falls.

Since the creation of Narva Reservoir in 1955, the waterfalls are usually dry, but water is allowed to flow in the original channel for up to a few days every year. Access to the waterfalls is difficult as they are located in the border zone and the surrounding area on the Estonian side is closed industrial land belonging to Krenholm Manufacturing Company.

References

Waterfalls of Russia
Waterfalls of Estonia
Narva